The Little Pamet River is a  river in Truro, Massachusetts on Cape Cod.

The river arises in wetlands, flows west for about one mile, and drains into Cape Cod Bay. The nearby Pamet River lies a few miles to the south.

References

Rivers of Barnstable County, Massachusetts
Rivers of Massachusetts